Preobrazhenovka is a rural locality (a village) in Nikolayevsky Selsoviet, Sterlitamaksky District, Bashkortostan, Russia. The population was 383 as of 2010. There are 3 streets.

Geography 
Preobrazhenovka is located 22 km southwest of Sterlitamak (the district's administrative centre) by road. Vesyoly is the nearest rural locality.

References 

Rural localities in Sterlitamaksky District